Henry Keswick may refer to:

 Henry Keswick (politician) (1870–1928), British taipan of Jardine Matheson & Co and Member of Parliament
 Sir Henry Keswick (businessman) (born 1938), British chairman of Jardine Matheson & Co, grandson of the above